Asterix & Obelix is a game released by Infogrames in 1995, for DOS, Windows, SNES, Game Boy and Game Boy Color. The player can choose to play with both Asterix or Obelix. The game also supports two players at the same time (both on the keyboard).

Gameplay

Asterix and Obelix is a side-scrolling action game. It starts with Asterix, for instance in the village (Getafix, Geriatrix and Vitalstatistix can be seen) and moves on with the player going in the forest and beating up the Romans. Later, the player gets a message from Britain and must cross the sea. The game takes place in different countries, including Britania, Helvetia, Grecia, Egyptia and Hispania. The aim is to guide Asterix or Obelix through each level until they reach the end. Both playable characters can jump, run and attack enemies, which are mostly Romans.

Languages
The DOS version of the game contains the following languages: French, English, German, Spanish, Portuguese and Italian.
For its Super NES release the Portuguese and Italian languages were omitted.

Development
The game's levels are based on the books Asterix in Britain, Asterix in Switzerland, Asterix at the Olympic Games, Asterix and Cleopatra and Asterix in Spain. The fourth mission on the Game Boy Advance version is based on Asterix and the Black Gold instead of Asterix and Cleopatra.

References

External links

Asterix & Obelix at myabandonware.com

1995 video games
DOS games
Europe-exclusive video games
Game Boy games
Game Boy Color games
Game Boy Advance games
Infogrames games
Multiplayer and single-player video games
Platform games
Super Nintendo Entertainment System games
Video games based on Asterix
Video games developed in France
Windows games
Video games scored by Allister Brimble
Promethean Designs games